The Jonathan apple is a medium-sized sweet apple, with a touch of acid and a tough but smooth skin. It is closely related to the Esopus Spitzenburg apple, good for eating fresh and for cooking. Sugar 14%, acid 9g/litre, vitamin C 5mg/100g.

History
There are two alternative theories about the origin of the Jonathan apple.

The first is that it was grown by Rachel Negus Higley. Mrs. Higley gathered seeds from the local cider mill in Connecticut before the family made their journey to the wilds of Ohio in 1796 where she planted them.  She continued to carefully cultivate her orchard to maturity and named the resulting variety after a young local boy that frequented her orchard: Jonathan Lash.

The other, and more accepted, theory is that it originated from an Esopus Spitzenburg seedling in 1826 from the farm of Philip Rick(s) in Woodstock, Ulster County, New York. Although it may have originally been called the "Ricks" apple, it was soon renamed by Judge Buel, President of Albany Horticultural Society, after Jonathan Zander, who discovered the apple and brought it to Buel's attention.

Descendants  
Jonagold—a cross between Jonathan and Golden Delicious apples
Jonamac—a cross between Jonathan and McIntosh apples
Rubinstar
Idared
Melrose
Undine
Akane
Querina Florina (scab resistant)

Disease susceptibility
Scab: high
Powdery mildew: high
Cedar apple rust: high
Fire blight: high

References 

Cooking apples
American apples